Alexander Mcmullin (born ) is an Australian male volleyball player. He is part of the Australia men's national volleyball team. On club level he plays for University of Alberta.

References

External links
 profile at FIVB.org

1995 births
Living people
Australian men's volleyball players
Place of birth missing (living people)